3D Ultra Lionel Traintown is a 1999 third-person railroading game by Sierra On-Line under the casual game brand Sierra Attractions, licensed by Lionel, LLC. It consists of train layouts, some of which the player can edit.

The locomotives include a Union Pacific EMD SW1500 switcher, an Atchison, Topeka and Santa Fe Railway F3A diesel locomotive (usually used to pull passenger trains), a 2-8-0 steam locomotive, and a 1950s passenger railcar.

An enhanced version, titled 3D Ultra Lionel Traintown Deluxe, was released the following year.

Gameplay

There are six difficulties, known as job rosters. Each difficulty has 11 jobs, then unlocking a twelfth. Most jobs are based on picking up and delivering loads via freight and passenger cars. Other jobs involve moving numbered freight cars to make valid addition, subtraction, multiplication, and division equations at kindergarten through fifth grade difficulty levels. There are memory-matching, pick-up sticks, hangman, Tower of Hanoi, and anagram scramble jobs with set time limits. The game has seven different play environments including a desert, the arctic, a living room, and the moon.

Reception

3D Ultra Lionel Traintown won the 2000 Computer Family Title of the Year award from the Academy of Interactive Arts and Sciences.

See also 
 Lionel Trains: On Track: Nintendo DS game licensed by Lionel Trains

References 

 3D Ultra Lionel TrainTown by Sierra Attractions. Reviewed by Christine & Mike Messersmith
 Review Corner: Children's Software 3D Ultra Lionel Deluxe
 PC Player (Germany) review

Sierra Entertainment games
1999 video games
Windows games
Windows-only games
Railroad games
Lionel, LLC
Video games scored by Christopher Stevens
D.I.C.E. Award for Family Game of the Year winners
Dynamix games
Video games developed in the United States